Steve Gottlieb is an American entrepreneur and former music executive. He is founder and CEO of Shindig, a platform for online video chat events. Prior to Shindig, Gottlieb founded the independent record label TVT Records and its publishing arm TVT Music, and produced the "Television's Greatest Hits" series.

Biography
Steve Gottlieb grew up in New Rochelle, New York, and attended Harvard Law School.  Before law school, he earned a B.A. in literature from Yale University

Gottlieb was selected in 1996 as one of the "40 Under Forty", a listing of leading New York executives, by Crain's New York Business. In 2005, he was named to the Hip Hop Power 30 by The Source magazine.

Shindig
Shindig allows users to see and be seen by participants in an online event.

Vice President of Engineering Manik Bambha, a former technology executive at MySpace and Fox Interactive Media, joined Shindig in 2011.

Shindig launched a beta release of its platform for video chat book tours in May 2012. By August of the same year, the company had hosted 150 events for authors including A.J. Jacobs, Dan Ariely, Joel Stein, Scott Sigler, and James Howard Kunstler. Beginning in September 2012, Shindig targeted music events, online nightclubs, magazine subscriber events, and interactive classroom applications as uses for its video chat platform technology. Personalities and entities who used Shindig include Bill Gates, TEDx, Guy Kawasaki, Michael Pollan, Edward Jay Epstein, Carla Hall, Big Daddy Kane, A.J. Jacobs, Kevin Kelly, Dan Ariely, and Jackson "Cat Daddy" Galaxy.

Music career

Television's Greatest Hits 
In 1986, Gottlieb produced Television's Greatest Hits, which he released on his own label Tee Vee Toons. The double album featured a collection of 65 themes from hit TV shows of the 1950s and 1960s in their original arrangements, production styles, and lengths.

Gottlieb found a previously untapped demand for the genre with the release of Television's Greatest Hits. Television's Greatest Hits became a series of 10 double albums encompassing the entire history of TV themes.

TVT Records 
Gottlieb decided to leverage the distribution network that he had developed with "Television's Greatest Hits" by signing artists and building his label, which he renamed TVT Records. TVT would ultimately grow into one of the most successful independent labels in U.S. history, and was named independent label of the year by Billboard Magazine and Soundscan for 2000, 2001, 2002, 2003, 2004, and 2005. Among Gottlieb's notable signings to TVT were, Nine Inch Nails, Ja Rule, Lil Jon, Pitbull,  Gil Scott Heron, Sevendust and The Connells. Other notable releases and signings included Snoop Dogg presents the 213, Yo Gotti, Ying Yang Twins, Underworld, The Timelords, Ambulance LTD, XTC and Jimmy Page and The Black Crowes Live at The Greek . The company had a robust soundtrack division that released over 100 major soundtracks, including those for Mortal Kombat and Blade. Its Broadway division released the first complete cast recording of Steven Sondheim's Follies. 

The company purchased the WaxTrax label and continued the WaxTrax legacy with continuing successful releases by KMFDM and others.

In the early 2000s, Gottlieb offered the TVT library as free downloads and provided its repertoire to digital music retailers, including Rhapsody, Liquid Audio, and Napster. TVT Records was sold to The Orchard.

TVT Music 
Under Gottlieb's direction, TVT Music Publishing was begun in 1990. The goal of the company was to sign and develop the talents of new songwriters and place their compositions with artists and labels for release.

TVT Music Publishing's writers wrote or co-wrote such hits as Usher's "Yeah!", 50 Cent's "Candy Shop", Chris Brown's "Run It", and Lil Jon's "Get Low". Other artists who recorded songs from TVT Music Publishing's catalog include Tom Jones, Christina Aguilera, Justin Timberlake, Ricky Martin, Beyoncé, Pink, Ludacris, Johnny Cash, Mariah Carey, Fat Joe, Lil' Kim, Toni Braxton, Ja Rule, Janet Jackson, John Legend, Dr. Dre, and the Ying Yang Twins. TVT Music Publishing's writers/producers included Scott Storch (ASCAP 2004 Songwriter of the Year) and Lil Jon (BMI 2005 Songwriter of the Year). TVT Music Publishing was sold to Reservoir Media Management in 2010.

Independent Music and Digital Music 
In 2000, Gottlieb assembled a team of independent label executives to establish, A2IM, the American Association of Independent Music,  a body that continues to represent the interests of American Independent Music Labels. In 2001, Gottlieb appeared as a witness before the Senate Judiciary Committee at a hearing entitled "Online Entertainment And Copyright Law: Coming Soon To A Digital Device Near You". He spoke about independent labels and changes in the music business resulting from the digital music revolution.

References 

1957 births
Living people
Businesspeople from New Rochelle, New York
20th-century American Jews
American music industry executives
American technology chief executives
Harvard Law School alumni
Yale College alumni
21st-century American Jews